Three Kingdoms, also known as Sangokushi in Japanese, is a Hong Kong manhua based on Yū Terashima's novel Sangokushi Meigentan, which is loosely adapted from Records of the Three Kingdoms and the 14th century novel Romance of the Three Kingdoms. The manhua was illustrated by Lee Chi Ching and was released in 14 volumes between 1991 and 1999 by Culturecom Limited. It was also the first Hong Kong manhua to be published in cooperation with Japanese publishers.

Three Kingdoms was followed by a sequel, Three Kingdoms: The Last Chapter, also known as Sangokushi: Kanketsuhen in Japanese.

Hong Kong comics titles
Romance comics
Wuxia comics
1991 comics debuts
Comics based on fiction
Works based on Romance of the Three Kingdoms
Comics set in the Three Kingdoms